Winter Hill may refer to:

Places
 Winter Hill (North West England), a hill on the border between Greater Manchester and Lancashire, England
 Winter Hill transmitting station, a broadcasting and telecommunications site on the hill
 Winter Hill (air disaster), a plane crash at Winter Hill
 Winter Hill, Somerville, Massachusetts, U.S.
 Winter Hill, a district of Cookham, Berkshire
 Winterhill, a district of Milton Keynes, England

Other uses
 "Winter Hill" (song) by Doves, and the second single from their 2009 album Kingdom of Rust
 Winter Hill Gang, a crime gang based in Boston, US, in the late 20th century
 Winterhill School, a comprehensive school situated in Kimberworth, South Yorkshire, England